KNIN-FM (92.9 MHz), "Wichita Falls' #1 Hit Music Station," is a radio station broadcasting a Top 40 (CHR) format. The station serves the Wichita Falls, Texas area.  The station is currently owned by Townsquare Media.

History
92.9 FM in Wichita Falls was built in late 1973 and early 1974, signing on as KBID and owned by the Mustang Broadcasting Company. The callsign changed to KNIN-FM in 1981 when KNIN acquired it. KNIN-FM was Wichita Falls' affiliate for Dan Ingram's Top 40 Satellite Survey. In 1988, the station dropped its CHR formula to twitch into a short-lived Rock 40 format, similar to Dallas-Fort Worth's KEGL right around the time KEGL began fading out their rock format, but had dropped its flavor in 1990. 

Moran Broadcasting Company sold KNIN-FM to Apex Broadcasting in 1997; Apex was bought by Clear Channel in 2000, and Clear Channel divested the station in 2003 to GAP Broadcasting of Dallas who later merged with current owner Townsquare Media in 2010.

References

External links

NIN-FM
Radio stations established in 1975
1975 establishments in Texas
Townsquare Media radio stations
Contemporary hit radio stations in the United States